Chef d'escadre (literally "squadron commander") was a rank in the French Navy during the Ancien Régime and until the French Revolution. The rank was changed to contre-amiral by a law passed on 15 May 1791.

History 
The first chefs d'escadre were created by Louis XIII in 1627 - he had a "chef d'escadre of Normandy" commanding the port of Le Havre, a chef d'escadre of Brittany commanding Brest, and a chef d'escadre of Guyenne commanding Brouage. Each of these chefs d'escadres, as officiers d'épée, were flanked by a commissaire général, an officier de plume.

Their numbers grew rapidly: in 1635 a chef d'escadre of Provence was created, then in 1647 a chef d'escadre for Flanders, in 1663 one for Poitou-Saintonge, in 1673 one for Picardy and one for Languedoc, in 1689 one for Aunis, in 1701 one for America, and in 1707 one for Roussillon. After 1715, there were more chefs d'escadre than there were coastal provinces, and so they started taking the title "chefs d'escadre des armées navales" (squadron-chiefs of the naval armies). From 1772, there were 25 of them.

The chefs d'escadres were chosen from among the capitaines de vaisseau; as the flag of their command they flew a "cornette" at the top of their flagship's main-mast (a flag named after its resemblance in shape to a cornette, making it roughly the same shape as a British commodore's 'broad pennant').

The rank of Chef d'escadre was junior to that of Lieutenant-général des armées navales. From 25 March 1765, the rank was senior to Brigadier des armées navales, renamed to Chef de Division on 1 January 1786.

Sources and references 
 Notes

Citations

References

 

Military ranks of France
Navy of the Ancien Régime